Calle 54 is a 2000 documentary film about Latin jazz by Spanish director Fernando Trueba. With only minimal introductory voiceovers, the film consists of studio performances by a wide array of Latin Jazz musicians. Artists featured include Chucho Valdés, Bebo Valdés, Cachao, Eliane Elias, Gato Barbieri, Tito Puente, Paquito D'Rivera, Chano Domínguez, Jerry Gonzalez, Dave Valentin, Aquíles Báez, and Michel Camilo. The film takes its name from Sony Music Studios, where much of the film was shot, which are located on 54th Street in New York City.

References
Notes

External links
 
 

2000 films
Documentary films about jazz music and musicians
Films directed by Fernando Trueba
Spanish documentary films
2000s Spanish-language films
2000 documentary films
Films scored by Graeme Revell
Films produced by Fernando Trueba